Khalilan-e Olya may refer to various villages in Iran:

Khalilan-e Olya, Kermanshah
Khalilan-e Olya, Lorestan